James Wadsworth (August 25, 1819 – May 18, 1891) was Mayor of the City of Buffalo, New York, serving 1851–1852.

Early life
Wadsworth was born in Durham, Connecticut on August 25, 1819 to Wedworth Wadsworth, Jr. (1782–1860) and Content (née Scranton) Wadsworth (1783–1839).  His elder brothers included Wedworth Wadsworth (1811-1874) and William Wadsworth (c. 1817-1870), the Durham Town Clerk and Justice of the Peace. Wadsworth graduated from Yale College in 1841.

Family
His paternal grandfather, John Noyes Wadsworth II (1758–1814) was the elder brother of William Wadsworth (1765–1833) and James Wadsworth (1768–1844), who settled in and founded Geneseo.  Their father, John Noyes Wadsworth (1732–1817) was the younger brother of James Wadsworth (1730–1816), a Brigadier General in the American Revolution and later an anti-Federalist during the ratification of the U.S. Constitution in Connecticut. They were all members of the prominent Wadsworth family of Connecticut, descended from William Wadsworth (1594–1675), one of the Founders of Hartford, Connecticut who under, the leadership of Pastor Thomas Hooker, helped found that city in June 1636.

Career
After graduating from Yale in 1841, he moved to Buffalo.  In 1843, he moved back to New Haven, Connecticut, and for two years studied literature and then law.

In 1845, he returned to Buffalo, and established the law firm of Wadsworth & Cameron.  He became involved in real estate and purchased land from Judge Ebenezer Walden.  In 1850, he was chosen Buffalo city attorney. On March 4, 1851, was elected as the Locofoco candidate for mayor.  During his term, the New York and Erie Railroad was completed from New York to Dunkirk and the Buffalo Female Academy opened.  His term as mayor ended on March 9, 1852.

In 1851, Wadsworth became president of the Buffalo, Brantford and Goderich Railroad and continued this after his mayoral term ended. He was a Democratic member of the New York State Senate (31st D.) from 1856 to 1858, sitting in the 79th, 80th and 81st New York State Legislatures. He resigned his seat on August 18, 1858.

Later career
In 1859, he removed to New York City, and for the next 25 years he was engaged in "various railway, mining, and oil companies." He worked for Wells & Fargo's Overland Express, and practiced law part of the time.  He also served as chairman of the Loyal League of Union Citizens during the U.S. Civil War.

Personal life
On September 8, 1845, he married Rosetta F. Robinson. Together, they were the parents of six children, including:

 Wedworth Wadsworth (1846–1926), a painter and author.
 Augustus Henry Wadsworth (1850–1861)
 Rose Frances Wadsworth (1856–1939)
 Hannah Wadsworth (b. 1856)
 James Wadsworth, Jr. (b. 1860)

After her death in 1866, he remarried to Virginia C. Conklin of Norfolk, Virginia on July 9, 1873. Around 1889, he was placed in an institution in Yonkers, New York where died May 18, 1891, and was buried at Durham, Connecticut.

References

1819 births
1891 deaths
Wadsworth family
Mayors of Buffalo, New York
Democratic Party New York (state) state senators
People from Durham, Connecticut
19th-century American politicians
Yale College alumni
19th-century American businesspeople